Nygmet Nurmakov (25 April 1895 – 27 September 1937) was a Kazakhstani politician who served as a prime minister of Kazakhstan from October 1924 – February 1925. 

In 1926, he was accused of supporting ethnic nationalism and exiled from Kazakhstan.

He was the chairman of the Council of People's Commissars.

References

 
1895 births
1937 deaths
Kazakhstani politicians
Prime Ministers of Kazakhstan
Soviet politicians